Jamaal Butler (born July 31, 1988) is a male sprinter from Nassau, Bahamas, who mainly competes in the 400m. He attended St. Augustine's College in Nassau, Bahamas, before going on to compete for South Plains College and
Texas Tech University.   Butler ran the third leg of the  Relay at the NACAC U23 Championships in Athletics that won silver,  as well as the third leg for the same event at the 2006 World Junior Championships in Athletics in Beijing, China. 

Personal bests

References

External links
 World Athletics
 Texas Tech

1988 births
Living people
Bahamian male sprinters
South Plains College alumni
Texas Tech University alumni
Texas Tech Red Raiders men's track and field athletes
People from Nassau, Bahamas
Sportspeople from Nassau, Bahamas
Junior college men's track and field athletes in the United States